Nemingha is an outer suburb of Tamworth, New South Wales, Australia, 5 km east of the Tamworth Central Business District on the New England Highway. West of Nemingha is East Tamworth and the Tamworth Central Business District.

Schools

Nemingha Public School

References

External links

Suburbs of Tamworth, New South Wales
Main North railway line, New South Wales